West Rockport is an unincorporated village in the town of Rockport, Knox County, Maine, United States. West Rockport has a post office with ZIP code 04865.

References

Villages in Knox County, Maine
Villages in Maine